This article lists all of the numbered municipal roads in Greater Sudbury, Ontario. Municipal roads in Greater Sudbury are generally numbered with odd numbers for east-west routes and even numbers for north-south routes.

The city of Greater Sudbury is the only census division in Northern Ontario that maintains a system of numbered municipal roads. County or municipal road systems otherwise exist only in Southern Ontario; in the rest of the Northern region, provincially maintained secondary highways serve a similar function. Several of the city's municipal roads were also numbered as secondary highways prior to the creation of the current municipal road system in 1973.

Prior to the amalgamation of the current city of Greater Sudbury, the numbered road system was maintained by the Regional Municipality of Sudbury, and the roads were designated as regional, rather than municipal, roads.

References

Greater Sudbury
Greater Sudbury